
Črni Vrh means 'black peak' in Slovene and may refer to:

Populated places
 Črni Vrh, Dobrova–Polhov Gradec, Slovenia
 Črni Vrh, Idrija, Slovenia
 Črni Vrh Observatory, astronomical observatory
 Črni Vrh, Tabor, a dispersed settlement in the Municipality of Tabor, Slovenia
 Črni Vrh v Tuhinju, Slovenia
 Montefosca, a settlement in Pulfero, Province of Udine, Italy, known as Črni Vrh in Slovene

Mountains
 Črni vrh, a peak on Pohorje, Slovenia

Other uses
 Črni Vrh dialect, a Slovene dialect

See also
 Crni Vrh (disambiguation), Serbo-Croatian equivalent